Fransiskus Xaverius Hadi Rudyatmo (born 13 February 1960), commonly referred to as F. X. Hadi Rudyatmo, is an Indonesian politician and was the former Mayor of Surakarta. His party is the Indonesian Democratic Party – Struggle (PDI-P).

Before he was mayor, he had been elected into Surakarta's city council in 2004, and became the deputy mayor in 2005. After being reelected in 2010, he became the mayor when Joko Widodo became the Governor of Jakarta. He was then reelected in 2015.

References 

Mayors of Surakarta
Javanese people
Indonesian Roman Catholics
1960 births
Living people
Members of Surakarta city council
Mayors of places in Indonesia